John Browne, 1st Earl of Altamont (c.1709 – 4 July 1776), known as The Lord Mount Eagle between 1760 and 1768 and as The Viscount Westport between 1768 and 1771, was an Irish peer and politician. He began the building of Westport House and the town of Westport.

Background and education
Browne was the only son of Peter Browne, a prosperous Catholic landowner in County Mayo, and Mary Daly. He was a grandson of Colonel John Browne, a signatory of the Treaty of Limerick, and of Denis Daly, judge of the Court of Common Pleas (Ireland). His sisters were Roman Catholics but he himself was a member of the Church of Ireland. He matriculated at Christ Church, Oxford, in July 1725.

Career
Browne was High Sheriff of Mayo in 1731, and was elected Member of Parliament for Castlebar in 1744, an office he held until 1760, although he rarely attended Parliament. He was raised to the Peerage of Ireland as Baron Mount Eagle, of Westport in the County of Mayo, and in 1768 he was created Viscount Westport, of Westport in the County of Mayo. In 1771 he was even further honoured when he was made Earl of Altamont, in the County of Mayo.

He was an active and improving landlord, with a particular interest in the breeding of livestock and the improvement of crop strains. He also did much to improve the linen trade in the town of Westport, County Mayo. He also extensively rebuilt Westport House, which remained the family home until 2017.

Family and issue
Lord Altamont married Anne Gore, daughter of Sir Arthur Gore, 2nd Baronet and Elizabeth Annesley, in December 1729. Their children – six sons and four daughters – included:

 Peter Browne, 2nd Earl of Altamont, c. 1731 – 28 Dec 1780 from whom descended the Marquess of Sligo.
 Colonel Arthur Browne (b. 14 Mar 1731 – 21 Jul 1779, Boston, New England), served at Quebec, 1770s MP for Mayo.
 Lady Anne Browne, c. 1740 – 21 Feb 1815
 George Browne, MP for County Mayo, c. 1735–1782; father of  Dominick Geoffrey Browne who  married  Margaret the daughter of the Hon. George Browne, 4th son of John, 1st Earl of Altamont. Dominick and Margaret were the parents of: A) Dominick Browne 1st Lord Oranmore and Browne 1787-1860 and Catherine Anne Isabella, daughter of Henry Monck, in 1811. Dominick Browne son Geoffrey Guthrie-Browne succeeded to the Peerage; another son was William Montague Browne (1823–1883) an Officer in the Confederate States Army. B) Henrietta Browne,(1789–1862) married Henry, Viscount Dillon and was ancestral to Clementine (the wife of Winston Churchill) and to the Mitford sisters.
 James Browne, MP for Castlebar and Prime Serjeant of Ireland, c. 1736–1790
 Henry Browne, (b. 1738; d. 28 Jan 1811, Molesworth Street, Dublin)
 John Browne, married Mary Cocks; their daughter Mary Browne married on 14 May 1800 Peter Blake of Corbally Castle, County Galway (? - 1842, bur. Peter’s Well, County Galway); their grandson Peter Blake of Corbally Castle (c. 1805 - bur. St. Ann's, Dublin, 19 November 1850), was a Galway-born county Inspector of the Irish Constabulary, and married at Mobarnan, County Tipperary, Jane Lane (Lanespark, County Tipperary, 5 March 1819 - ?), daughter of John Lane of Lanespark, County Tipperary; their great-grandson was Sir Henry Arthur Blake

References

Bibliography
 Westport House and the Brownes, Denis Browne, Westport, 1981
 Dictionary of Irish Biography, p. 917, Cambridge, 2010

External links
 Thepeerage.com
 Freepages.genealogy.rootsweb.ancestry.com

Politicians from County Mayo
High Sheriffs of Mayo
John
Irish MPs 1727–1760
Alumni of Christ Church, Oxford
1700s births
1776 deaths
Members of the Parliament of Ireland (pre-1801) for County Mayo constituencies
Peers of Ireland created by George II
Earls of Altamont